Kenneth Ting Woo-shou (SBS, JP, is a Hong Kong-based businessman and industrialist. He has been the Managing Director/CEO of Kader Industrial Company Limited, a toys and plastics manufacturer, since its incorporation in 1989. Since 1993 he has been the company's chairman.

Affiliations
He currently serves as chairman or honorary president of many public bodies, including:

 Federation of Hong Kong Industries
 Chinese Manufacturers' Association of Hong Kong
 Toys Manufacturers' Association of Hong Kong
 Hong Kong Plastics Manufacturers Association
 Non-Executive Director of the Mandatory Provident Fund Schemes Authority
 Member of the Manpower Development Committee of the Education and Manpower Bureau
 Former LegCo member (see Legislative Council minutes)

Family
 Dr. Dennis Ting Hok-shou, brother
 Ivan Ting Tien-li, son
 Angie Ting Ho Wing Man, daughter-in-law
 Nancy Ting Wang Wan-sun, wife
 Kirsten Ting Ji You, granddaughter
 Gratian Ting Yun Yan, grandson

Awards
Silver Bauhinia Star, 2004

External links
 Biodata for Kenneth Ting Woo-shou at Bachmann Industries' Board of Directors webpage

Year of birth missing (living people)
Hong Kong chief executives
Living people
HK LegCo Members 1998–2000
HK LegCo Members 2000–2004
Liberal Party (Hong Kong) politicians
Hong Kong corporate directors
Hong Kong chairpersons of corporations
Members of the Selection Committee of Hong Kong
Members of the Election Committee of Hong Kong, 1998–2000
Members of the Election Committee of Hong Kong, 2000–2005
Members of the Election Committee of Hong Kong, 2007–2012
Members of the Election Committee of Hong Kong, 2012–2017
Members of the Election Committee of Hong Kong, 2017–2021
Recipients of the Silver Bauhinia Star